Senator East may refer to:

Don W. East (1944–2012), North Carolina State Senate
John Porter East (1931–1986), U.S. Senator from North Carolina